Robin Sidebotham, known professionally as Robin George, is a British rock guitarist, singer, songwriter and producer. He achieved success during 1985 with the song "Heartline", which peaked at #68 in the UK Singles Chart and #92 in the US Hot 100 (#40 in the Mainstream Rock chart). The single was featured on George's debut album Dangerous Music (1984). Born in Wolverhampton, West Midlands, George has collaborated with several artists during his career including David Byron, Phil Lynott, Glenn Hughes, Robert Plant and John Wetton.

Selected discography
Dangerous Music (1984)
Rock of Ageists (2001)	
Bluesongs (2004)
Dangerous Music II (2015)
Rogue Angels (2018)
Heartlines (2021)
Surreal Six Strings (2021)
Wilderness (2021)
Feed the Wolf (2021)
Asia 2 (2021)
Rockstar Legends (2021)
RockinG Lovepower (2021)
Dangerous Music Euro Live (2021)

References

External links

Year of birth missing (living people)
Living people
20th-century English musicians
20th-century British male singers
21st-century English musicians
21st-century British male singers
English rock guitarists
English rock singers
English male singer-songwriters
musicians from Wolverhampton
Bronze Records artists